The The Bradby Shield Encounter, colloquially referred to as The Bradby, is an esteemed event within Sri Lanka's school rugby union season. This annual fixture takes place between two renowned boys’ schools in the country, namely Royal College, Colombo, and Trinity College, Kandy. The encounter involves two legs, with one currently held at the Royal College Sports Complex in Colombo and the other at the Trinity College Rugby Stadium in Pallekele. The winner of the competition is determined based on the aggregate of scores from both matches, typically played a couple of weeks apart.

This rugby fixture garners significant attention from spectators across the country. It is considered the most widely-viewed rugby match in Sri Lanka, drawing larger crowds than both inter-club and international fixtures. This important event serves as a social gathering for the current and past pupils, their families, extended families and well-wishers with near-capacity attendance at venues and a significant viewership for the live broadcasts, both domestically and internationally.

History 
Royal College and Trinity College, two distinguished institutions of Sri Lanka, were among the pioneers to embrace the game of rugby union, with their maiden match held on the 31 July 1920, marking a historic milestone. Subsequently, this remarkable encounter evolved into a yearly tradition, where Trinity College maintained an unbeaten streak for the first two decades, until their first defeat to Royal College in 1941. Notably, in 1945, Mr. E. L. Bradby, the Principal of Royal College, extended an offer to Mr. C. E. Simithraaratchy, the Principal of Trinity College, proposing the donation of a coveted Shield. Mr Simithraaratchy graciously accepted this proposal. The Shield was to be contested annually, with the victor being the college that achieved the highest total score over the two-leg series, one leg played in Colombo and the other in Kandy, as initiated in 1943.

This annual event has persevered through the years, with the exception of the year 1971, where only the first leg was played due to the 1971 JVP insurrection. The Shield was presented to Royal College, the victors of the first leg. The COVID-19 pandemic forced the cancellation of the event in both 2020 and 2021, marking the only other time in which this illustrious event could not take place.

The Shield 
The Shield, a product of Kandyan silversmiths, was graciously bestowed upon the series by Principal E.L. Bradby before his departure from Ceylon in 1945. A wooden disk of exquisite design, it is embellished with intricate, traditional Kandyan silverwork, serving as a treasured symbol of victory and an enduring testament to the magnificence of this storied encounter.

Following the conclusion of the second leg of the series, the Shield is ceremoniously presented to the captain of the triumphant team in an award ceremony conducted on the playing field. The winning team is then afforded the privilege of retaining possession of this esteemed trophy until the next year, whereupon it will be proudly showcased at their school, eagerly awaiting the commencement of another fiercely contested and highly anticipated clash

Venue 
The Bradby Shield Encounter is traditionally contested over two legs, with one match held in Colombo and the other in Kandy. Historically, the venue for the Colombo fixture had been the Sugathadasa Stadium. In the early 2000s, matches were relocated to the Royal College Sports Complex. Meanwhile, the Kandy leg of the tournament was held at the Bogambara Stadium or at the Nittawela Rugby Stadium. Since 2012, this event has been contested at Trinity College's home ground, Trinity College Rugby Stadium in Pallekelle.

Pre Bradby Shield Matches - 1920-1944

The Bradby Shield - Past Winners

Summary of Results

1945-1954

1955-1964

1965-1974

1975-1984

1985-1994

1995-2004

2005-2014

2015-2022

Notable People Who Have Played 

Royalists
 J. R. Jayawardene (Pre Bradby Era)
 Rajan Kadiragamar (Pre Bradby Era)
 Harry Goonatilake (Pre Bradby Era)
 U.N.Gunasekera (Pre Bradby Era)
 C. V. Gunaratne
 C. R. De Silva
 Ken Balendra
 Ratna Sivaratnam
 Daya Perera
 Norman Gunewardene
 S. A. Dissanayake
 Lakdasa Dissanayake
 Maiya Gunasekara
 Ajit Gunewardene

  

Trinitians
 Michael Kagwa Snr. (Pre Bradby Era)
 Michael Kagwa Jnr. (Pre Bradby Era) 
 Denzil Kobbekaduwa
 Duncan White
 Lakshman Kadirgamar
 Jayantha Dhanapala
 Parami Kulatunga 
Kemal Deen

Related Community Initiatives

The Souvenir 
Since 1977, the Royal College Interact Club has published the Bradby Shield Souvenir to commemorate the encounter's Colombo leg.

Bradby Express 
The Bradby Express was the name given to the regular Intercity Express train service offered by the Sri Lanka Railways that was packed with students and old boys from both schools on their way to the Kandy leg of the encounter - hence the name Bradby Express. It started off in the 1950s and was held yearly until the mid-1980s, when it was halted due to security concerns resulting from the intensification of the Sri Lankan Civil War and the Insurrection 1987-89.

Since the end of the Sri Lankan Civil War, a chartered train dubbed as The Bradby Express has served this role, transporting Royal supporters to and from Kandy for the event.

Bradby Golf
Former Royal and Trinity students compete for the G. C. Wickremesinghe Challenge Trophy, a golf tournament hosted at the  Victoria Golf & Country Resort since 2016 during the Kandy leg of the event.

Notable Moments in Bradby Shield History 
 The longest winning streak in the series is six, recorded by Trinity between 1952 and 1957. From 2001 through 2004, Royal won the shield four seasons in a row.
 Due to security concerns stemming from the 1971 JVP Insurrection, only one leg of the 1971 contest was staged between the schools. The Shield was awarded to Royal College as a result of the 1st leg at an assembly by Mr E. L. Fernando, the then-principal of Trinity College.
 Mr. and Mrs. E. L. Bradby travelled to Sri Lanka as guests of The Royal College Union for the 2nd leg, which also happened to be the 100th rugby football match between Royal and Trinity.
 The encounter in 1992 resulted in a tie after both legs were drawn, 0-0 in Kandy and 3-3 in Colombo. This marks the first time such an outcome has occurred in Bradby history. The 2016 encounter similarly finished in a tie, with Royal winning the 1st leg 22-17 and Trinity winning the 2nd leg 18-13, making it only the series' second tie.
 Royal College set the record for the largest margin of victory in 2002, winning by an aggregate score of 83-00.
 The 2nd leg match of the 2008 encounter marked the 150th meeting between Royal and Trinity.
 In 2010, both teams combined for 126 points (Royal 72 - Trinity 54), establishing a series record.
 The 2019 encounter marked the 75th anniversary of the series. The matches were postponed numerous times in the aftermath of the 2019 Sri Lanka Easter bombings and was played under heightened security.
 Due to the COVID-19 pandemic, the series was suspended in 2020 and 2021, marking the first time in its history that the Bradby series was totally halted.

See also 
 Royal College
 Trinity College

Notes

References 

Rugby union competitions in Sri Lanka
Royal College, Colombo
Sri Lankan sports trophies and awards
Trinity College, Kandy
University and college rugby union competitions